Geritola gerina, the Gerina epitola, is a butterfly in the family Lycaenidae. It is found in Ivory Coast, Ghana, Togo, southern Nigeria, Cameroon, Gabon, the Republic of the Congo, the Central African Republic, the Democratic Republic of the Congo, Uganda and north-western Tanzania. The habitat consists of forests.

References

External links
Die Gross-Schmetterlinge der Erde 13: Die Afrikanischen Tagfalter. Plate XIII 65 b

Butterflies described in 1878
Poritiinae
Butterflies of Africa
Taxa named by William Chapman Hewitson